A slip bond is a type of chemical noncovalent bond whose dissociation lifetime decreases with tensile force applied to the bond. This is the expected behaviour for chemical bonds, but exceptions, like catch bonds exist.

References

Chemical bonding
Biophysics
Cell adhesion